Colomba is a surname. Notable people with the surname include:

Davide Colomba (born 1988), Italian football player
Elizabeth Colomba (born 1976), French painter of Martinique heritage 
Franco Colomba (born 1955), Italian football coach and former player; father of Davide Colomba
Giovanni Battista Colomba (1638–?), Italian Baroque painter and architect
Luca Antonio Colomba (1674–1737), Swiss Baroque painter
Massimo Colomba (born 1977), Swiss football goalkeeper

it:Colomba